Big Foot Mama is a rock band from Ljubljana, Slovenia. It is one of the most popular Slovenian pop rock bands of the 1990s. 

The group started their career in 1990. After their third album, Tretja dimenzija (The Third Dimension), they were already considered as the Slovenian pop rock band of the decade, breaking sales records in rock category and selling out some of the biggest venues in the Slovenian capital Ljubljana like Križanke and Hala Tivoli, which were previously considered as unconquerable for Slovenian rock bands.

Current lineup
Grega Skočir - vocals
Daniel Gregorič - guitars
Alen Steržaj - bass
Jože Habula - drums
Zoran Čalić - guitars

Discography
Nova pravila (New Rules) - 1995
Kaj se dogaja? (What Is Going On?) - 1997
Tretja dimenzija (Third Dimension) - 1999
Doba norih (Age of the Mad) - 2001
Big Foot Mama [best of] - 2003
5ing (Petting) - 2004
15 let v živo z gosti (15 Years - Live with Guests) - 2006
Važn, da zadane (Important, that it Hits) - 2007
Izhod (Exit) - 2012

External links
 Official Site

Slovenian rock music groups
Musical groups established in 1990
Musical groups from Ljubljana